Air Mail is an iOS game developed by British studio Chillingo Ltd and released on May 24, 2012.

Critical reception
The game has a Metacritic score of 85% based on 11 critic reviews.

SlideToPlay wrote " Air Mail is a delightful flight sim with broad appeal. It's about the precise controls and engaging story, not locking on with missiles or machine guns. " Vandal Online said " An original, fun and entertaining app that is above most of the games in the App Store. Its gameplay is direct and its control great, and is also beautifully crafted in graphics. " AppSmile said " A high-flying and highly-enjoyable experience, Air Mail allows you to take to the skies like few others. " Gamezebo wrote " Despite its lack of realism, fans of flight will want to sample it-as will anyone else who's just in the mood for a whimsical iOS game. " 148Apps said " Air Mail definitely lives up to the promise that the game had when I first got to play it. This is a fun flying game that has the feel of a Nintendo 64 or Dreamcast classic with its colorful graphics and feel, and it's well worth the premium app price to check it out. "

TouchGen wrote " This is one of my favorite high-flying games on iOS. It looks fantastic, provides solid options for controls and has a cool story that makes each and every task feel important. I would love to have seen some multiplayer and improved cutscenes. That being said, this is a damn good game that I absolutely loved, and highly recommend. "
TouchArcade wrote "The advanced control requires a good bit of practice to get it right, but should eventually be your control of choice. " Edge Magazine said " And though a clutch of score-based challenges are both too few and too brisk, they contribute to an iOS game of rare generosity and substance. " AppSpy wrote " Air Mail brings a much-needed sense of fun and freedom to the App Store, encouraging players to breathe in its wonderful world through exploration. " Modojo wrote " Air Mail could've been exceptional, but as it stands, the game will just have to settle for being great, with beautiful art work, tight controls and fun exploration/time-based play. " Pocket Gamer UK said " An impressive game with a gorgeous world you'll want to explore, Air Mail is only let down by its lack of challenge. "

References

2012 video games
Chillingo games
Flight simulation video games
IOS games
IOS-only games
Single-player video games
Video games developed in the United Kingdom